Stenimantia is a genus of flies in the family Stratiomyidae.

Species
Stenimantia carbonaria (Philippi, 1865)

References

Stratiomyidae
Brachycera genera
Taxa named by Günther Enderlein
Diptera of South America